was a Japanese professional wrestling event promoted by the New Year's Eve Pro-Wrestling Committee, comprising multiple independent wrestling promotions. The event, held on December 31, 2011, at Korakuen Hall in Tokyo, Japan aired live on Fighting TV Samurai.

Ten matches were contested at the event, including a dark match. In the main event, a 74-person tag team match, the team led by Ken Ohka defeated the team led by Ryuichi Sekine. Other prominent matches saw the team of Great Kojika and Antonio Honda win a 15-team gauntlet match celebrating the 15th anniversary of the launch of the Samurai TV channel, and Naomichi Marufuji defeated Tatsuhiko Yoshino in a special singles match. The event also featured the Japan Indie Awards ceremony and the retirement ceremony of Munenori Sawa ending his 8-year career.

Production

Background
The tradition of holding a joint event for smaller promotions on New Year's Eve at Korakuen Hall started with the 2006 Indy Summit. In 2009, the  brand was created for the Tenka Sanbun no Kei: Ōmisoka New Year's Eve Special event.

There were twenty-one participating promotions and brands at the event:

Big Japan Pro Wrestling (BJW)
Combat Zone Wrestling (CZW)
 (DEP)
 (666)
DDT Pro-Wrestling

Ice Ribbon
 (IWF)
JWP Joshi Puroresu
Kaientai Dojo (K-Dojo)

Michinoku Pro Wrestling (M-Pro)
 (NBPW)
Osaka Pro Wrestling (OPW)
Pro Wrestling Freedoms
Pro Wrestling Noah

World Wonder Ring Stardom

Storylines
The show featured ten professional wrestling matches that resulted from scripted storylines, where wrestlers portray villains, heroes, or less distinguishable characters in the scripted events that build tension and culminate in a wrestling match or series of matches.

Results

Gauntlet match

References

2011 in professional wrestling
Active Advance Pro Wrestling
Big Japan Pro Wrestling shows
Combat Zone Wrestling shows
DDT Pro-Wrestling shows
Ice Ribbon
JWP Joshi Puroresu
Osaka Pro Wrestling
Pro Wrestling Noah shows
Professional wrestling in Tokyo
Holidays themed professional wrestling events